Eileen Chesis is an American actress who appeared as a child in several American network television series of the 1960s.

Television career 
Chesis portrayed Cissy Porter, one of the daughters in the sitcom The Tom Ewell Show in 1960-1961.  Her other television work as a child consisted of appearances in Lassie, in the crime-drama The Detectives, in the medical-drama The Eleventh Hour, and in the western Destry — she also appeared (as two different characters) in two different episodes of Bonanza (1962-1963).

Her only television work as an adult was in 1975, where she played Nancy in the live-action super-hero series The Secrets of Isis.

Film career 
She appeared, despite uncredited, in the 1960 film Tall Story.

Personal life 
Chesis was born in Newark, New Jersey. She married lawyer Richard Devirian on March 8, 1975.

References

External links 
 

American film actresses
American television actresses
Living people
21st-century American women
Year of birth missing (living people)